WEC 7: This Time It's Personal was a mixed martial arts event promoted by World Extreme Cagefighting on August 9, 2003, at the Palace Indian Gaming Center in Lemoore, California. In the main event, Ron Waterman fought James Nevarez to decide WEC's inaugural Super Heavyweight Champion.

Results

See also 
 List of World Extreme Cagefighting champions
 List of WEC events
 2003 in WEC

External links
 WEC 7 Results at Sherdog.com

World Extreme Cagefighting events
2003 in mixed martial arts
Mixed martial arts in California
Sports in Lemoore, California
2003 in sports in California